Washington Merritt Grant Singer (1866–1934) was an American-born English heir, philanthropist and prominent racehorse owner.

Biography

Early life
Born in Yonkers, New York he was  the third child of Isabella Eugenie Boyer and sewing machine magnate, Isaac Singer. The family moved to England when Washington Singer was still a child. He was raised at Oldway Mansion at Paignton on the Devon coast.

Equine interests
After he received his inheritance upon his father's death, he originally planned to run a ranch in the American West, but after spending time hunting in Devonshire with his brother, Mortimer Singer, he decided to stay in England and become a racehorse owner.

A Thoroughbred horse racing enthusiast, he won the 1905 St. Leger Stakes with the colt Challacombe, trained by Alec Taylor, Jr. and the 1932 2,000 Guineas with Orwell. The Washington Singer Stakes race at Newbury Racecourse is named in his honour.

He was elected to the Jockey Club in July 1921.

Philanthropy
He became a benefactor of a number of causes and was a substantial donor to the University College of the Southwest of England, which later became the University of Exeter. One of the university's buildings, which is home to the Department of Psychology, is named in his honour.

Personal life

Singer lived at Steartfield House, Paignton (now the Palace Hotel). He married his first wife, Blanche Wills-Hale, in 1887.  On 21 July 1915 he married Ellen Mary Longsdon, widow of Alfred Allen Longsdon, who had been drowned at Le Havre while driving his ambulance earlier that year. On 25 July 1927 they adopted Mary's youngest son, Grant Allen (Longsdon), in the name of Grant Allen Singer (1915–1942).

He was Sheriff of Wiltshire in 1924.

Norman Court 
In 1903, Singer purchased Norman Court, West Tytherley, Hampshire, an 18th-century country house with a  estate that included the Hampshire parishes of Buckholt and Frenchmoor, and in Wiltshire the village of West Dean and parts of Farley and Pitton. The estate was inherited by his son Grant but he was killed in action during World War II at the 1942 Second Battle of El Alamein while serving with the Royal Armoured Corps, 10th Royal Hussars.

Sold by his widow in 1952, Norman Court was the home of the private Norman Court Preparatory School from 1955 until 2012. In 2021 Norman Court reopened as a training and educational centre.Norman Court training and Education Centre. From 2013-2019 it has housed Montessori school. The building was recorded as Grade II* listed in 1986.

He died in his sleep in February 1934, in Torquay.

References

External links 
West Tytherley village website on Washington Singer's Norman Court Estate archived from the original on 20 November 2008

1866 births
1934 deaths
English philanthropists
British racehorse owners and breeders
People from Yonkers, New York